Adamson Tannehill (May 23, 1750 – December 23, 1820), a native of Maryland, is representative of the United States’ founding generation whose members were active participants in the early military and political events of their country's establishment. He was among the first volunteers to join the newly established Continental Army during the American Revolutionary War. He served for five and a half years, ultimately achieving the rank of captain and commander of the army's longest serving rifle unit. After the war, Tannehill and members of his family settled in Pittsburgh, his last military post of the conflict. He was an early leading citizen of Pittsburgh and a distinguished Pennsylvania politician who held several local and state appointed and elected offices, including one term as a U.S. Congressman; served on the founding boards of civic, state, and national organizations; and had prominent military roles in the state's post-Revolutionary War years.

Early years
Adamson Tannehill was born in Frederick County, Maryland, probably close to Frederick Town (now Frederick). He was the oldest of nine children born to John Tannehill, owner of a tobacco plantation, and Rachel Adamson. His maternal grandfather took a special interest in the grandchild who bore his name, and he provided funding to secure a fine education for Adamson. Little else is known of Adamson's earliest years. No known portraits of Tannehill exist; however, family records indicate that as an adult he “was six feet in height, well proportioned and of commanding appearance.” At the age of 25, he enlisted in one of the first American military units to form when the war with Great Britain started in the spring of 1775.

Revolutionary War service
Tannehill served in the Continental Army during the American Revolutionary War, initially as the first sergeant in Capt. Thomas Price's Independent Rifle Company, one of the original ten independent companies of riflemen from the frontier regions of Pennsylvania, Maryland, and Virginia authorized by the Continental Congress on June 14, 1775. He received his commission dated January 1, 1776, as a third lieutenant while serving at the Siege of Boston. In June 1776 Tannehill and his company were incorporated into the newly organized Maryland and Virginia Rifle Regiment, at which time he advanced to second lieutenant. Later that year a large portion of his regiment was captured or killed at the Battle of Fort Washington on northern Manhattan Island. However, those members of the unit not taken in the battle, including Tannehill, continued to serve actively with Washington's Main Army, participating in the Battles of Trenton and Princeton, and in the spring of 1777 were administratively attached to the 11th Virginia Regiment. Tannehill was promoted to first lieutenant on May 18, 1777, and the following month he was attached to the newly organized Provisional Rifle Corps commanded by Col. Daniel Morgan, which played a major role in the Battles of Saratoga and a peripheral role in the Battle of Monmouth. He returned to the Maryland and Virginia Rifle Regiment (his permanent unit) in mid-1778 when Lt. Col. Moses Rawlings, the regiment's commander who had been exchanged from British captivity earlier that year, was marshaling the remnants of his unit and recruiting new members while stationed at Fort Frederick, Maryland. In early 1779 Tannehill and the regiment were assigned to Fort Pitt of present-day western Pennsylvania where they supplemented other Continental forces engaged in the defense of frontier settlements from Indian raids. Tannehill advanced to the rank of captain on July 29, 1779, and he commanded the regiment in late 1780. He was discharged from service on January 1, 1781, when his unit was disbanded, and was admitted as an original member of The Society of the Cincinnati in the state of Maryland when it was established in 1783.

Early Pittsburgh
After the war Tannehill settled in Pittsburgh, as did a number of other Revolutionary War officers, including his brother Lt. Josiah Tannehill. He initially engaged in agricultural pursuits and was a tavern owner and vintner, president of the Pittsburgh Fire Co., and a trustee of the first Presbyterian church in Pittsburgh. He later served as a local Justice of the Peace; lieutenant colonel of Westmoreland Co. militia starting in 1788; an original member of the Board of Directors of the Pittsburgh branch of the Bank of Pennsylvania, the first bank in Pittsburgh, starting in 1804; one of five turnpike commissioners for the state starting in 1811; major general of Pennsylvania Volunteers during the War of 1812; and president of the Pittsburgh branch of the Bank of the United States starting in 1817.

The high point of Tannehill's active political career was his election as a Republican to the Thirteenth U.S. Congress for the period 1813–1815. He was an unsuccessful candidate for reelection in 1814 to the Fourteenth Congress.

In October 1800, Tannehill was temporarily removed from his office of Justice of the Peace after being convicted of extortion related to an event that occurred five years before in which he was alleged to have charged two shillings more than was allowed by law for two probates. Although he was quickly reinstated to office in January 1801 by Governor Thomas McKean, the former Chief Justice of Pennsylvania, and subsequently held several prominent public offices, Tannehill believed the charges against him, likely born out of the contentious political conditions of the time, had marred his reputation. He vehemently disclaimed any guilt for the rest of his life.

Death
Tannehill died near Pittsburgh in 1820 at the age of 70. He was survived by his wife, Agness Morgan Tannehill, and his ward, Sydney Tannehill Mountain. Tannehill was interred in the churchyard of the First Presbyterian Church and reinterred in Allegheny Cemetery in Pittsburgh in 1849.

Notes

References
Adamson Tannehill Papers: Historical Society of Western Pennsylvania, MFF 2176, 10 p. (Tannehill's commission as third lieutenant in Capt. Otho Holland Williams’ Independent Rifle Company, dated January 1, 1776, from the Continental Congress; Tannehill's commission as lieutenant colonel of the fourth battalion, Westmoreland County militia, dated July 10, 1788, from the Supreme Executive Council of Pennsylvania).
Boucher, John N. (1908). A century and a half of Pittsburgh and her people. New York: The Lewis Publishing Co.
Chalfant, Ella (1955). A goodly heritage: earliest wills on an American frontier. Pittsburgh: University of Pittsburgh Press.
Coe, Letitia Tannehill (1903)]. History of John and Rachel Tannehill and their descendants [unpublished manuscript]. Fort Wayne: Allen County Public Library, call number 929.2 T155F, 17 pp.
Dahlinger, Charles W. (1916). Pittsburgh: a sketch of its early social life. New York: G. P. Putnam's Sons.
Dahlinger, Charles W. (1919). A place of great historic interest: Pittsburgh's first burying-ground. Pittsburgh: (no publisher given).
Daniel Morgan General Orders (May 18, 1777): Virginia Historical Society, Orderly book of Major William Heth, call number Mss12:1777 May 15:1.
Ford, Worthington C., ed. (1905, 1906, 1909). Journals of the Continental Congress, 1774-1789. Washington, D.C.: Library of Congress, v. 2, pp. 89-90; v. 5, p. 540; v. 13, p. 104; v. 14, p. 896.
Foster, Morrison (1932). My brother Stephen. Indianapolis: private printing.
Harper, Frank C. (1931). Pittsburgh of today, its resources and people. New York: The American Historical Society, Inc., v. 1, pp. 355-356, v. 2, p. 754.
Hentz, Tucker F. (2006). "Unit history of the Maryland and Virginia Rifle Regiment (1776–1781): Insights from the service record of Capt. Adamson Tannehill." Military Collector & Historian 58(3), 129–144. .
Hentz, Tucker F. (2007). Unit history of the Maryland and Virginia Rifle Regiment (1776-1781): Insights from the service record of Capt. Adamson Tannehill. Richmond: Virginia Historical Society, Library General Collection, call number E259 .H52 2007, 46 p. (Expanded archive manuscript from which Hentz [2006] is derived.)
Killikelly, Sarah H. (1906). The history of Pittsburgh: its rise and progress. Pittsburgh: B. C. & Gordon Montgomery Co., pp. 111, 263, 362.
Long's Provisional Rifle Co. pay roll (July 1777): U.S. National Archives and Records Administration, Record Group 93, microcopy M246, roll 133, frames 414-415 (“Pay Roll of Capt. Gabl. Long’s Detach’d Comy. of Rifle men Commdd. by Colo. Danl. Morgan for the month of July 1777”).
Maryland Historical Society (1900). Archives of Maryland: muster rolls and other records of service of Maryland troops in the American Revolution (1775–1783). Baltimore: The Lord Baltimore Press (v. 18, p. 365: “Officers in the Maryland part of the Rifle Regiment Supernumerary Jany., 1st, 1781”).
Maryland Historical Society (1927). “A muster roll of Captain Thomas Price’s Company of Rifle-Men in the service of the United Colonies.” Maryland Historical Magazine 22, 275–283.
Metcalf, Bryce (1938). Original Members and Other Officers Eligible to the Society of the Cincinnati, 1783-1938: With the Institution, Rules of Admission, and Lists of the Officers of the General and State Societies. Strasburg, VA: Shenandoah Publishing House, Inc.
Return of the Maryland Corps (December 25, 1780): Maryland State Archives, Maryland State Papers (Series A), Box 21, Item 119A, MSA No. S 1004-27 (“A Return of the Commissioned Officers of the Maryland Corps (Late Rawlings’s) Specifying their Names, Rank, Claims to Promotion &c.”).
Thurston, George. H. (1888). Allegheny County's hundred years. Pittsburgh: A. A. Anderson & Son.
Walkinshaw, Lewis C. (1939). Annals of southwestern Pennsylvania. New York: Lewis Historical Publishing Co., pp. 65, 356.

External links

The Political Graveyard
 The Society of the Cincinnati
 The American Revolution Institute

1750 births
1820 deaths
American Presbyterians
Continental Army officers from Maryland
Drinking establishment owners
Politicians from Pittsburgh
People of Pennsylvania in the American Revolution
Democratic-Republican Party members of the United States House of Representatives from Pennsylvania
Burials at Allegheny Cemetery